Adolf Josef Lanz (19 July 1874 – 22 April 1954), also known under his pseudonym as fascist agitator Jörg Lanz von Liebenfels, was an Austrian political and racial theorist and occultist, who was a pioneer of Ariosophy. He was a former monk and the founder of the magazine Ostara, in which he published anti-semitic and völkisch theories.

Early life
He was born on 19 July 1874 in the Penzing district of Vienna in what was then Austria-Hungary, as the son of schoolmaster Johann Lanz and his wife Katharina, née Hoffenreich. His parents were middle class, and his father's ancestors had been burghers in Vienna since the early 18th century. His mother was believed to have been of Jewish ancestry, making him fail his own racial criteria. Consequently, he claimed to be the son of Baron Johannes Lancz de Liebenfels and began to call himself "Baron Adolf Georg (Jörg) Lanz Von Liebenfels Ph.D."

As a young boy, he was fascinated by the myth of the Holy Grail.

Liebenfels became a monk in the Cistercian order in 1893, assuming the name Georg and living in the Heiligenkreuz monastery. In 1894, he claimed to have become “enlightened" after finding the tombstone of a Knight Templar, and began developing his theories of "blue-blond Aryanism" and "lower races". In 1899, he left the Cistercian order.

Work with Theozoology

In 1905, he published his book Theozoölogie oder die Kunde von den Sodoms-Äfflingen und dem Götter-Elektron (Theozoology, or the Science of the Sodomite-Apelings and the Divine Electron) in which he advocated sterilization of the sick and the "lower races" as well as forced labour for "castrated chandals", and glorified the "Aryan race" as "Gottmenschen" ("god-men"). Liebenfels justified his esoteric racial ideology by attempting to give it a Biblical foundation; according to him, Eve, whom he described as initially being divine, involved herself with a demon and gave birth to the "lower races" in the process. Furthermore, he claimed that this led to blonde women being attracted primarily to "dark men", something that only could be stopped by "racial demixing" so that the "Aryan-Christian master humans" could "once again rule the dark-skinned beastmen" and ultimately achieve divinity. A copy of this book was sent to Swedish poet August Strindberg, from whom Liebenfels received an enthusiastic reply in which he was described as a "prophetic voice".

One year later, in 1905, Liebenfels founded the magazine Ostara, Briefbücherei der Blonden und Mannesrechtler, of which he became the sole author and editor in 1908. Liebenfels himself claimed to have up to 100,000 subscribers, but it is generally agreed that this figure is grossly exaggerated. Readers of this publication included Adolf Hitler, Dietrich Eckart and the British Field Marshal Herbert Kitchener among others. Liebenfels claimed he was visited by the young Hitler in 1909, whom he supplied with two missing issues of the magazine.

As a student of Guido von List, Liebenfels further expanded his theories; other influences included Otto Weininger, of whom Liebenfels was a fervent follower, and Helena Blavatsky.

Secret Society Order of the New Templars 

The Order of the New Templars – Ordo Novi Templi (ONT) was a  proto-fascist secret society in Germany founded by Lanz in 1900. It was modelled after the catholic military order Knight Templars and similar in its hierarchical structure as the Order of Cistercians which was the group that trained the New Templars founder Adolf Lanz.

The goal was to bring rightwing extremists together and mobilise them in favor of Nazism in Germany. Members used code names so that betrayal was difficult.

The founder Lanz was the fascist ideologist and agitator of the group justifiying violence against innocent human beings with punishments such as castration in order to establish fascism in Germany and defend it against communism.

Interactions with Aryan societies
In 1905 Liebenfels and some 50 other supporters of List signed a declaration endorsing the proposed Guido-von-List-Gesellschaft (Guido von List Society), which was officially founded in 1908. He also founded his own esoteric organisation, the Ordo Novi Templi (Order of the New Templars) in 1907. These movements were supposed to "further the racial self-confidence by doing pedigree and racial research, beauty contests and the founding of racist "future sites" in underdeveloped parts of the Earth" (das Rasse Bewusstsein durch Stammbaum- und Rassekunde Forschung, Schönheitswettbewerbe und die Gründung rassistischer Zukunftsstätten in unterentwickelten Teilen der Erde zu fördern). To further this agenda, he purchased the Werfenstein castle ruins in Austria. Neither organization managed to attract a large member base; though, it is estimated that the order had around 300 members, most prominent of which was the poet Fritz von Herzmanovsky-Orlando. Liebenfels‘s claim that the organization was already founded prior to 1900, and that he met with August Strindberg in 1896 and managed to convince him to join the order, have been shown to be fabricated.

After Hitler's rise to prominence in the 1920s, Liebenfels tried to be recognized as one of his ideological precursors. In the preface of issue one in the 3rd series of Ostara, c. 1927, he wrote:

After Austria was annexed by Nazi Germany in 1938, Liebenfels hoped for Hitler's patronage, but Hitler banned him from publishing his writings and copies of Ostara were removed from circulation. After the war, Liebenfels accused Hitler of having not only stolen but corrupted his idea, and also of being of "inferior racial stock".

There is no strong scholarly consensus as to whether Hitler was significantly influenced, directly or indirectly, by Liebenfels‘s work, and no strong evidence that he was interested in the occult movement as a whole apart from its racial aspects, though the association has been repeatedly made by critics and occultists during and after the Third Reich.

Publications
In his publications, Liebenfels mixed völkisch and anti-semitic ideas with Aryanism, racism and esotericism. The following is a partial list of Liebenfels‘s publications:

 Katholizismus wider Jesuitismus ("Catholicism versus Jesuitism"), Frankfurt, 1903
 Anthropozoon biblicum, in Vjschr. für Bibelkunde 1, 1903/1904
 Zur Theologie der gotischen Bibel ("Regarding the Theology of the Gothic Bible") in Vjschr. für Bibelkunde 1, 1903/1904
 Theozoologie oder die Kunde von den Sodoms-Äfflingen und dem Götter-Elektron ("Theozoology, or the Account of the Sodomite Apelings and the Divine Electron"), Vienna, (1905)
 
 
 Das Breve "Dominus ac redemptor noster", Frankfurt, 1905
 Der Taxilschwindel. Ein welthistorischer Ulk, Frankfurt, 1905
 Ostara (magazine), 89 or 100 issues, Rodaun and Mödling, 1905–17 (38 issues were republished in Vienna between 1926 and 1931)
 Kraus und das Rassenproblem ("Kraus and the Race Problem"), in Der Brenner 4, 1913/1914
 Weltende und Weltwende, ("World's End and World's Turn"), Lorch, 1923
 Grundriss der ariosophischen Geheimlehre ("Outline of the Ariosophic Secret Teachings"), Oestrich, 1925
 Der Weltkrieg als Rassenkampf der Dunklen gegen die Blonden ("The World War as a Race Fight Between the Dark and the Blondes"), Vienna, 1927
 Bibliomystikon oder die Geheimbibel der Eingeweihten ("Bibliomystikon, or the Secret Bible of the Initiated"), 10 volumes, Pforzheim and elsewhere, 1929–1934
 Praktisch-empirisches Handbuch der ariosophischen Astrologie ("Practical-empirical Handbook of Ariosophic Astrology"), Düsseldorf, 1926–34
 Jakob Lorber. Das grösste ariosophische Medium der Neuzeit, Düsseldorf, 1926, 4 Bänden.

See also
 Antisemitism
 Eugenics
 German mysticism
 Guido von List
 Helena Blavatsky
 Nazi occultism
 Nazism
 Schutzstaffel
 Theosophy

References

Bibliography

 Joachim C. Fest: Hitler, p. 169f & 175f, Book I (chapter 2 & 3)
 Ekkehard Hieronimus: Lanz von Liebenfels. Eine Biographie, Toppenstedt, 1991
 Anton Maegerle, Peter Paul Heller: Thule. Vom völkischen Okkultismus bis zur Neuen Rechten, Stuttgart, 1995
 Wilfried Daim: Der Mann, der Hitler die Ideen gab (1st ed.: 1957; 2nd. ed.: 1985; 3rd ed.: 1994)

1874 births
1954 deaths
20th-century astrologers
20th-century Christian mystics
Antisemitism in Austria
Austrian astrologers
Austrian Cistercians
Austrian occultists
Christian fascists
Christian occultists
Germanic mysticism
People from Penzing (Vienna)
Pseudohistorians
Roman Catholic mystics
Austrian magazine founders